The Brebina is a right tributary of the river Motru in Romania. It discharges into the Motru near Baia de Aramă.

References

Rivers of Romania
Rivers of Mehedinți County